Mélanie Joly  (born January 16, 1979) is a Canadian politician and lawyer who has served as minister of Foreign Affairs since October 2021. A member of the Liberal Party, Joly represents the Montreal-area riding of Ahuntsic-Cartierville in the House of Commons, taking office as a member of Parliament (MP) following the 2015 federal election. She has held a number of portfolios including Canadian heritage, tourism, and La Francophonie. Joly ran for mayor of Montreal in the 2013 Montreal municipal election, placing second behind eventual winner Denis Coderre.

Born in Montreal, Quebec, Joly graduated from Université de Montréal and Brasenose College, Oxford.

Early and personal life
Born on January 16, 1979, she grew up in Montreal's northern neighbourhood of Ahuntsic. Joly's father is Clément Joly, an accountant who was president of the Liberal Party's finance committee in Quebec and manager of the Canadian Air Transport Security Authority from 2002 to 2007. Her stepmother, Carole-Marie Allard, is a lawyer and journalist, who was an MP representing Laval—East from 2000 to 2004.

Education and career 
After completing her Bachelor of Laws degree at the Université de Montréal in 2001, Joly became a member of the Barreau du Québec. She subsequently received the Chevening scholarship and continued her studies at Brasenose College, Oxford, where she received a Magister Juris in comparative and public law in 2003. Joly also interned at Radio-Canada, in 2007.

At the beginning of her career, Joly practiced law at two major Montreal law firms, Stikeman Elliott and Davies Ward Phillips & Vineberg. At the latter firm, her mentor was former Parti Quebecois premier Lucien Bouchard, who supplied her with a letter of recommendation for her Oxford application. She worked primarily in the areas of civil and commercial litigation, bankruptcy and insolvency law. She was also a prosecutor before the Gomery Commission of inquiry.

In 2010, she became the first Quebecer to receive the Arnold Edinborough award, which recognizes philanthropic involvement within the Canadian cultural community.

In 2013, she was appointed to head the Quebec Advisory Committee for Justin Trudeau’s leadership campaign of the Liberal Party of Canada.

Along with her colleagues, she founded Generation of Ideas, which is a political forum for 25- to 35-year-olds. She is also a member of the collective group Sortie 13, for which she wrote "Les villes au pouvoir ou comment relancer le monde municipal québécois".

Political career

Municipal campaign 

In June 2013, Joly announced her candidacy for mayor of Montreal in the elections which occurred in the same year. She founded a new party, Vrai changement pour Montréal, to support her candidacy. On November 3, election day, she obtained 26.50 per cent of the votes, finishing six points behind the winner, Denis Coderre. However, she finished ahead of several more established challengers.

Federal politics 
In 2015, Joly left municipal politics and announced her candidacy for the nomination of the Liberal Party of Canada in the new electoral district of Ahuntsic-Cartierville for the 2015 federal election. Joly won the riding with 47.5 per cent of the vote, unseating incumbent Maria Mourani.

In Cabinet 
After the election, Joly was named as the minister of Canadian heritage as part of Prime Minister Justin Trudeau's new government. On August 28, 2018, Joly was named to the tourism, official languages, and La Francophonie portfolio.

She assumed the position of Minister of Economic Development and Official Languages on December 13, 2019. Her mandate was marked by the introduction of separate regional development agencies for Western Canada: Canada Economic Development for the Prairies (PrairieCan) and Canada Economic Development for the Pacific (PacifiCan).

On June 15, 2021, she introduced Bill C-32 in the House of Commons, an Act to achieve substantive equality of English and French and to strengthen the Official Languages Act. The first reform since 1988, Joly's modernization was intended to ensure that the government's broad range of measures in support of official languages responded to and adapted to the challenges faced by these languages in the various regions of the country.

Minister of Foreign Affairs 

Joly took office as Canada's Minister of Foreign Affairs on October 26, 2021. On December 20, 2021, Joly announced that she had tested positive for COVID-19.

Amidst global concerns about a buildup of Russian troops on the country's eastern border, she visited Ukraine in January 2022. She visited again on May 8, 2022  when she accompanied Trudeau on an unannounced visit to Kyiv to reopen the Canadian embassy amidst the Russian invasion of Ukraine. One year after the invasion began, she touted her government's efforts to promote regime change in Russia.

In May 2022, Turkish President Recep Tayyip Erdoğan voiced his opposition to Sweden and Finland joining NATO, accusing the two countries of tolerating groups which Turkey classifies as terrorist organizations, including the Kurdish militant groups PKK and YPG and the supporters of Fethullah Gülen, a US-based Muslim cleric accused by Turkey of orchestrating a failed 2016 Turkish coup d'état attempt. Joly held talks with Turkey to convince the Turkish government of the need for two Nordic nations integration.

During the March 2023 House of Commons committee studying Chinese election interference in the 2019 and 2021 federal elections, Joly accused China of 'trying to sow division in many democracies' and suggested ways foreign meddling could be hindered in the future.

Electoral record

References

External links

Le vrai changement pour Montréal - groupe Mélanie Joly (official website)
Biography & mandate latter from the Prime Minister

 

Members of the House of Commons of Canada from Quebec
Liberal Party of Canada MPs
Women members of the House of Commons of Canada
Canadian women in municipal politics
Female Canadian political party leaders
Lawyers from Montreal
People from Ahuntsic-Cartierville
French Quebecers
Living people
Université de Montréal alumni
Alumni of Brasenose College, Oxford
Politicians from Montreal
Canadian women lawyers
Women in Quebec politics
1979 births
Members of the King's Privy Council for Canada
Members of the 29th Canadian Ministry
Women government ministers of Canada
21st-century Canadian women politicians
Chevening Scholars